He Pan (born 1 May 1988, in Liaoning) is a female Chinese long-distance runner who specializes in the 5000 metres event. She represented her country at the 2008 Summer Olympics.

Personal bests
1500 metres - 4:11.22 min (2007)
5000 metres - 15:08.03 min (2007)
Marathon - 2:39:29 hrs (2007)

References

Team China 2008

1988 births
Living people
Athletes (track and field) at the 2008 Summer Olympics
Chinese female long-distance runners
Olympic athletes of China
Runners from Liaoning